The Carnival Road March is the musical composition played most often at the "judging points" along the parade route during a Caribbean Carnival. Originating as part of the Trinidad and Tobago Carnival, the term has been applied to other Caribbean carnivals. There it was and is still viewed as a musical genre.

In Trinidad and Tobago the Road March title has been officially given out every year since 1932 (with the exception of the years affected by World War II when Carnival did not officially take place). Popular Unofficial Road Marches have also been recognized in T&T from since 1834 after slavery was abolished. Prior to World War II, T&T Road Marches were referred to as "Leggos" or "Breakaways" by the general population but were rebranded by the Carnival authorities as the Road March from 1946. Scoring is based upon a register-and-count system devised by a Carnival committee before the start of the parade. 

After a German pop song "Happy Wanderer" by the Obernkirchen Children's Choir won the Trinidad & Tobago Road March title in 1955 the rules were amended to restrict songs eligible to be in the road march competition to only songs vocalised by local Trinidad & Tobago artistes. The Road March title is among the most prestigious in Trinidad Carnival. The most such titles have gone to the late Lord Kitchener with eleven wins, ahead of Super Blue with ten wins, Machel Montano also with ten wins and the Mighty Sparrow with eight wins. In the mid-1970s, a woman officially broke through in the male dominated Calypso arena. Calypso Rose was the first female to officially win the Trinidad and Tobago Road March competition in 1977 with her song "Give More Tempo". The following year 1978 with "Come Leh We Jam" in addition to winning the Road March title again, Calypso Rose also won the "Calypso King" competition, the first time a woman had received that award. As a result, the "Calypso King" competition was officially renamed the "Calypso Monarch" competition to take into account that females also take part and have won titles.

First Calypso recordings were made in 1912 so Trinidad & Tobago Road Marches prior to 1912 were not recorded that year but may have been recorded years later after recording technology became available to Calypso pioneers of the 1910s to 1930s. In 2019 Skinny Fabulous of St. Vincent & the Grenadines created history by becoming the second foreign artiste (after the German Obernkirchen Children's Choir) and the very first foreign soca artiste to win the prestigious Trinidad & Tobago Road March title with a song called "Famalay" which was vocalised by Skinny Fabulous, Machel Montano and Bunji Garllin.

Trinidad and Tobago
Below are over 100 T&T Road Marches starting from this year going back to the 1800s when most calypsos were sung in Patios.

Antigua and Barbuda

Barbados

Grenada
Grenada Carnival, also known as Spicemas, was founded to celebrate the anniversary of the independence of Grenada, Carriacou, and Petit Martinique, which gained their independence on 7 February 1974. In 1978 Grenada Carnival was moved to the month of May by the Eric Gairy led government but after that government was overthrown in March 1979, the 1979 Carnival celebration was cancelled. In 1980 the new People's Revolutionary Government (PRG) led by Maurice Bishop brought back Grenada Carnival, which was held in May that year. After a feasibility study Grenada Carnival was moved to August the following year. Hence annually from 1981 Grenada's Carnival has been held in August culminating with their Road March competition.

St. Lucia
Invader has won the Road March in St. Lucia seven times. In a period from 1970 to 1972 and again from 1974 to 1976, Road March winners were imported from Trinidad and Tobago.

St. Vincent

Saint Kitts and Nevis

US Virgin Islands
The Jam Band, formerly Eddie and the Movements has won the Road March Title a record 21 times.

Anguilla

United Kingdom

See also
 Caribbean music

References

External links
 Carnival Info Road march Trinidad 
 http://www.toronto-lime.com/music/sfiles/tnt_roadmarch_winners.htm
 http://www.tntisland.com/rmhof.html
 https://web.archive.org/web/20120828083109/http://anguillasummerfestival.com/results11.php?eventID=42
 https://www.facebook.com/notes/eveything-and-anything-virgin-islands/st-thomas-road-march-songs-since-1978/105164392220 
 http://www.sknvibes.com/islandfacts/sitepage.cfm?p=170
 http://www.luciancarnival.com/content/road-march
 http://www.carnivalsvg.com/roachmarch.html
 https://madeingrenadawordpresscom.wordpress.com/tag/road-march/
 http://www.trinijunglejuice.com/home/carnival-grenada.php

Trinidad and Tobago songs
Calypso music
Soca music
Carnivals in Trinidad and Tobago
Carnival music